Shaktyor Salihorsk or Shakhtyor Soligorsk may refer to:
FC Shakhtyor Soligorsk, a Belarusian Premier League football club 
HC Shakhtyor Soligorsk, an ice hockey club in Soligorsk, Belarus